The Perth Thunder are an ice hockey team based in Perth, Western Australia, Australia and are members of the Australian Ice Hockey League (AIHL). Founded in 2010 the Thunder joined the AIHL in 2012 and have made the Goodall Cup playoffs on six occasions with their best result in 2019 where they finished as runners-up. Since their inception, 85 players have played at least one regular season or playoff game for the Thunder. The team's current captain is Jamie Woodman who took over the position in 2017 from Sam Wilson. Canadian Benjamin Breault, who has been playing for the club since 2016, leads the team in scoring with 197 points in 115 games.

Legend

Statistics complete as of the end of the 2019 AIHL season.

Goaltenders

Skaters

References
General

Specific

Perth, Western Australia-related lists
Australia sport-related lists
Lists of ice hockey players